is a Japanese football player. He plays for Giravanz Kitakyushu.

Career
Ryu Kawakami joined J3 League club Fukushima United FC in 2017. After a promising debut season in J3 League, he opted to sign for Giravanz Kitakyushu.

Club statistics
Updated to 22 February 2019.

References

External links
Profile at Giravanz Kitakyushu
Profile at Fukushima United FC

1994 births
Living people
Fukuoka University alumni
Association football people from Fukuoka Prefecture
Japanese footballers
J2 League players
J3 League players
Fukushima United FC players
Giravanz Kitakyushu players
SC Sagamihara players
Association football midfielders